John (Jack) Edward Otterson (August 25, 1905 – December 22, 1991) was an American art director. He was nominated for eight Academy Awards in the category Best Art Direction. He worked on 300 films between the years of 1934 and 1953.

He was born in Pittsburgh, Pennsylvania. He was educated at Yale, where he was an editor of a campus humor magazine The Yale Record with writer Geoffrey T. Hellman, writer and film critic Dwight Macdonald and Hollywood photographer Jerome Zerbe. He died in Los Angeles, California.

Awards
Otterson was nominated for eight Academy Awards for Best Art Direction:
 The Magnificent Brute (1936)
 You're a Sweetheart (1937)
 Mad About Music (1938)
 First Love (1939)
 The Boys from Syracuse (1940)
 The Flame of New Orleans (1941)
 Arabian Nights (1942)
 The Spoilers (1942)

Selected filmography
 The Missing Guest (1938)
 Arabian Nights (1942)
 The Spoilers

References

External links

1905 births
1991 deaths
American art directors
Artists from Pittsburgh
The Yale Record alumni